Loredana Sperini (born 1970) is a Swiss artist who works in the areas of sculpture, drawing, installation art and painting. Sperinini is particularly known for her sculpture works that use wax castings applied to a variety of surfaces.  

Sperinini was born in Wattwil, Switzerland. Her work is included in the collections of the Museum of Modern Art, New York and the Migros Museum für Gegenwartskunst.

References

21st-century Swiss women artists
1970 births
Living people